Vellozia is a plant genus in the family Velloziaceae, established in 1788.

The genus is endemic to South America except for one species (V. tubiflora), whose range extends into Panama. Most of the species are native to Brazil, with a dense concentration of species in the State of Minas Gerais.

 Species

References 

Velloziaceae
Pandanales genera